America's Most Musical Family is an American reality music competition television program that aired on Nickelodeon from November 1, 2019 to January 17, 2020. The program features 30 talented families competing for a record contract with Republic Records and a $250,000 cash prize. The Melisizwe Brothers were announced as the winning band of the series.

Production 
On February 14, 2019, it was announced that Nickelodeon was developing a reality competition television series under the working title of America's Most Musical Family. On July 25, 2019, Nick Lachey was announced as the host of the program, while Ciara, David Dobrik, and Debbie Gibson were announced as judges on the program. The program consisted of 12 episodes, as well as a special episode. Production on the program began in Los Angeles in July 2019. On October 2, 2019, it was announced that the program would premiere on November 1, 2019.

Episodes

Ratings 
 
}}

References

External links 
  (archived)
 

2010s American children's television series
2020s American children's television series
2010s American music television series
2020s American music television series
2010s American reality television series
2020s American reality television series
2010s Nickelodeon original programming
2020s Nickelodeon original programming
2019 American television series debuts
2020 American television series endings
American children's musical television series
American children's reality television series
English-language television shows